The Bound Brook School District is a comprehensive community public school district that serves students in pre-Kindergarten through twelfth grade from Bound Brook, in Somerset County, New Jersey, United States.

As of the 2020–21 school year, the district, comprised of five schools, had an enrollment of 1,975 students and 172.0 classroom teachers (on an FTE basis), for a student–teacher ratio of 11.5:1.

The district is classified by the New Jersey Department of Education as being in District Factor Group "B", the second-lowest of eight groupings. District Factor Groups organize districts statewide to allow comparison by common socioeconomic characteristics of the local districts. From lowest socioeconomic status to highest, the categories are A, B, CD, DE, FG, GH, I and J.

Students from South Bound Brook, New Jersey, attend the district's high school as part of a sending/receiving relationship with the South Bound Brook School District. At the beginning of the 2011-12, the school joined the Interdistrict Public School Choice Program, which allows students from other area communities to attend the Bound Brook schools.

Schools
Schools in the district (with 2020–21 enrollment data from the National Center for Education Statistics) are:
Elementary schools
LaMonte-Annex Elementary School with 195 students in grades PreK-Kindergarten
Hipolita Hernandez-Sicignano, Principal
Lafayette Elementary School with 266 students in grades 1-2
Erika Clarke, Principal
Smalley Elementary School with 545 students in grades 3-6
Nicholas Edwards, Principal
Middle school
Community Middle School with 283 students in grades 7-8
Dr. Joseph Santicerma, Principal
High school
Bound Brook High School with 652 students in grades 9-12
Edward Smith, Principal

Administration
Core members of the district's administration are:
Dr. Alvin Freeman, Superintendent
Vacant, Business Administrator / Board Secretary

Board of education
The district's board of education is comprised of nine members who set policy and oversee the fiscal and educational operation of the district through its administration. As a Type II school district, the board's trustees are elected directly by voters to serve three-year terms of office on a staggered basis, with three seats up for election each year held (since 2012) as part of the November general election. A tenth, appointed member, represents the interests of the South Bound Brook district. The board appoints a superintendent to oversee the district's day-to-day operations and a business administrator to supervise the business functions of the district.

References

External links
Bound Brook School District
 
School Data for the Bound Brook School District, National Center for Education Statistics

Bound Brook, New Jersey
New Jersey District Factor Group B
School districts in Somerset County, New Jersey